Oh No is the second studio album by American rock band OK Go. It was released 30 August 2005. The album was recorded in late 2004 with producer Tore Johansson in Malmö, Sweden and mixed by Dave Sardy in Los Angeles. It is the final album to feature guitarist Andy Duncan, who left shortly after recording finished.

As of January 12, 2007, the album had sold 198,045 units.

After the band's performance at the 2006 MTV Video Music Awards, their album moved up to #2 on the iTunes Music Store album sales charts (as of September 3, 2006). Their album sold 8,250 units in the following week, a 95% increase over the prior week, rocketing from #87 to #69 on the Billboard 200 albums chart, the highest position ever achieved by any OK Go album until the release of Of the Blue Colour of the Sky five years later.

On November 7, 2006, OK Go released a deluxe limited edition CD/DVD of the album. The DVD contains their videos (dancing and playing instruments), a video from 180 fans doing the "A Million Ways" dance for a YouTube contest, previously unseen footage, and a behind-the-scenes look of their treadmill rehearsals for the video and for the VMAs.

Track listing

"9027 km" is a 35-minute track on the US version of the album that is not included on the cover sleeve. It is a low-grade recording of frontman Damian Kulash's sleeping girlfriend. After parting with the label, Kulash would later admit that was a hasty recording that he made before submitting the final album to the record label. The track was added to pad out the CD and thereby prevent their label from using the extra space to add DRM software, which would limit transfer of the music from the CD. Kulash justified the inclusion of this track to the label as an old "love note" recording sent from his girlfriend while he was away recording the album and that it would have to be included in its entirety as his artistic license. He later reported that the label could have easily uncovered the truth - that the track was a hasty addition - because there were faint sounds of fireworks in the background of the recording, dating the recording to the 4th of July just before it was submitted. The name of the track is based on the distance between Malmö, Sweden and Los Angeles, California (9027 kilometers), where Kulash and his girlfriend were respectively based during the production of the album.

Reception

Oh No received generally positive reviews, and holds an aggregated 64 out of 100, based on 14 critic reviews, indicating "generally favourable reviews".

Personnel
OK Go
Damian Kulash Jr.: vocals, guitar, piano, keyboards, percussion
Tim Nordwind: bass, vocals, glockenspiel
Dan Konopka: drums
Andy Duncan: guitar, keyboards, vocals
Additional musicians
Jens Lingård – trombone on "A Good Idea at the Time" and "No Sign of Life"
Peter Lingård – trumpet on "A Good Idea at the Time" and "No Sign of Life"
Sven Andersson – trombone on "A Good Idea at the Time" and "No Sign of Life"
Filip Runesson – viola on "The House Wins"
Rasmus Kihlberg – second drummer on "It's a Disaster", "Crash the Party" and "The House Wins"
The Mopeds – actors on "Invincible" (portrayed the fictitious vocal group "The Space Odyssey Counting Gang" on the song)
Flor Serna – keyboard player on "It's a Disaster"
Hannah Montoya – hardcore drummer on "A Good Idea at the Time"

Production credits
Tore Johansson – producer/engineer/mixing engineer on "A Good Idea at the Time", "Oh Lately It's So Quiet", "It's a Disaster", "A Million Ways", "No Sign of Life", "Let It Rain", "Maybe, This Time" and "The House Wins"
Jens Lingård – assistant producer/engineer
David Carlsson – engineer
Peter Lingård – engineer
Dave Sardy – mixing engineer on "Invincible", "Do What You Want", "Here It Goes Again", "Crash the Party" and "Television, Television"
Ken Slutier – second unit producer
Eric Drew Feldman – second unit 1st assistant producer
Howard Willing – second unit 2nd assistant producer/A&R liaison for Capitol Records
Robert Vosgien – mastering engineer
Mary Fagot – art direction
Damian Kulash, Jr. – design
Sunja Park – layout
Dusan Reljin – photography
Tom Fowlks – additional photography

References

External links

2005 albums
OK Go albums
Capitol Records albums
Albums produced by Tore Johansson
2006 video albums
Capitol Records video albums